XHMRA-FM is a radio station in Mérida, Yucatán. Broadcasting on 99.3 FM, XHMRA is owned by MVS Radio and carries its Exa FM national format.

History
The station's concession was awarded in 1992 to Luis Aviña Ayala. In 2000, MVS Radio bought the station. It is one of very few MVS Radio stations not under the concessionaire of Stereorey México, S.A.

In 2015, the station lowered its effective radiated power from 98 to 91 kW.

References

External links
Ponte Exa Mérida Facebook

Radio stations in Yucatán
Radio stations established in 1992
MVS Radio